Keith Moliné is a British guitarist and electronic musician, best known for his work in Pere Ubu.  He has also performed with David Thomas and Two Pale Boys, Infidel, They Came from the Stars I Saw Them, and Prescott.  He uses Roland, Variax and Fernandes Sustainer technology, allowing him to produce numerous overlapping instrument voicings within the context of "live" playing.

References 

British rock guitarists
British male guitarists
Living people
Pere Ubu members
Year of birth missing (living people)